Papilionanthe sillemiana is a species of epiphytic orchid endemic to Myanmar.

Conservation
This species is included in the CITES appendix II and international trade is regulated to protect wild populations. It is considered endangered (EN) by the IUCN.

References

sillemiana
Orchids of Myanmar